Year 1167 (MCLXVII) was a common year starting on Sunday (link will display the full calendar) of the Julian calendar.

Events 
 By place 

 Europe 
 April 7 – Oath of Pontida: Supported by Pope Alexander III, the Lombard League is founded, a military alliance between the municipalities of Milan, Lodi, Ferrara, Piacenza and Parma, against the German invading forces of Emperor Frederick I (Barbarossa) in Northern Italy. The League (with other Italian cities) openly challenges Frederick's claim to power (Honor Imperii).
 April 12 – King Charles VII (Sverkersson) is murdered at Visingsö by supporters of Canute I (son of Eric IX), who proclaims himself king of Sweden. However, Charles's half-brothers Boleslaw and Kol Sverkerson proclaim themselves rulers of Östergötland, in opposition to Canute, which leads to fights for the power in Sweden (until 1173).
 May 29 – Battle of Monte Porzio: The army of the Commune of Rome is defeated by German forces under Frederick I and the local princes; Alexander III leaves Rome. Frederick proceeds to Rome, where he is crowned by Antipope Paschal III for the second time. A sudden outbreak of pestilence kills many of his advisors and knights.
 July 8 – Battle of Sirmium: Byzantine forces (15,000 men) under General Andronikos Kontostephanos defeat the Hungarians at Sirmium. Emperor Manuel I (Komnenos) consolidates his control over the western Balkans.  
 August – Frederick I claims imperial authority over Bohemia, Greater Poland and Hungary. He installs his 3-year-old son Frederick V as duke of Swabia, after Frederick's cousin, Frederick IV, dies of disease at Rome.

 Egypt 
 March 18 – Battle of Al-Babein: A second Zangid army (some 12,000 men) under General Shirkuh and his nephew Saladin marches towards Egypt, but is met by the combined Crusader-Fatimid forces led by King Amalric of Jerusalem. After skirmishing down the Nile, the Crusaders are defeated near Giza and forced to retreat to Cairo.
 May–June – Saladin leads the defence of Alexandria against the Crusader-Fatimid forces. He takes command over the garrison (plus some 1,000 cavalry), and the army's sick and wounded. 
 August 4 – Amalric I accepts a peace treaty and enters at the head of the Crusader army Alexandria. Saladin and his troops are escorted out with full military honours, and retreats to Syria.

 Ireland 
 Diarmaid mac Murchadha (or Dermot), former king of Leinster, returns to Ireland with an advance party under Richard de Clare (Strongbow).

 England 
 King Henry II prohibits English students from attending the University of Paris; many settle at the University of Oxford.

 Asia 
 Taira no Kiyomori becomes the first samurai to be appointed Daijo Daijin, chief minister of the government of Japan. 
 By topic 

 Religion 
 Absalon, Danish archbishop and statesman, leads the first synod at Lund. He is granted land around the city of "Havn" (modern-day Copenhagen) and fortifies the coastal defence against the Wends.

Births 
 February – Frederick VI, duke of Swabia (d. 1191)
 Anders Sunesen, archbishop of Lund (d. 1228)
 Warin II (the Younger), Norman knight (d. 1218)
 William I, count of Holland (Low Countries) (d. 1222)

Deaths 
 January 12 – Aelred of Rievaulx, English abbot (b. 1110)
 February 27 – Robert of Melun, bishop of Hereford (b. 1100)
 April 12 – Charles VII (Sverkersson), king of Sweden (b. 1130)
 July 13 – Xia (Shenfu), Chinese empress consort (b. 1136)
 August
 Děpold I, Bohemian prince (epidemic)
 Frederick IV, duke of Swabia (epidemic)
 Henry I, count of Nassau (epidemic)
 Henry II, duke of Limburg (epidemic)
 August 14 – Rainald of Dassel, German archbishop (b. 1120)
 August 17 – Nicolò Politi, Italian monk and hermit (b. 1117)
 August 22 – Relindis of Hohenburg, French abbess
 September 10 – Matilda, Holy Roman Empress (b. 1102)
 Abraham ibn Ezra, Spanish philosopher (approximate date)
 Alaungsithu, Burmese king of the Pagan Dynasty (b. 1090)
 Basava, Indian philosopher and statesman (b. 1105)
 Christian I (the Quarrelsome), count of Oldenburg
 Euphrosyne of Polotsk, Kievan princess (b. 1104)
 Hugh of Poitiers, French monk and chronicler
 Occo of Schleswig (or Ogge), Danish bishop
 Raymond I (or Raimond), French nobleman
 Rostislav I, Grand Prince of Kiev (b. 1110)

References